The Prix Juigné is a flat horse race in France open to three-year-old thoroughbred colts and geldings. It is run over a distance of 2,100 metres (about 1 mile and 2½ furlongs) at Longchamp in April. It is restricted to horses which have not raced previously.

History
The event was established in 1894, and it was originally called the Prix de la Reine Marguerite. It was initially contested by colts and fillies over 2,000 metres, and had prize money of 20,000 francs. The inaugural running was won by Sesame.

The race continued with its original title until 1900, and was renamed the Prix Juigné in 1901. It was named in memory of Gustave de Juigné, a member of the Société d'Encouragement.

The distance of the race was extended to 2,100 metres in 1925. Its prize money increased throughout the 1920s, reaching 100,000 francs in 1929. It was held at Auteuil in 1943, and Maisons-Laffitte in 1944. Its prize was 300,000 francs on both occasions.

During the post-war period, the Prix Juigné was contested by several notable horses. The runner-up in 1955, Phil Drake, subsequently won that year's Epsom Derby.

The event was closed to fillies and shortened to 2,000 metres in 1990. It was restored to 2,100 metres in 2017.

Records
Leading jockey since 1980 (6 wins):
 Freddy Head – Sea Boy (1980), Fin Gourmet (1981), Comtal (1982), Donato (1985), Deja (1991), Red Victory (1994)

Leading trainer since 1980 (10 wins):
 André Fabre – Galant Vert (1983), Klimt (1986), Raneen (1989), Topelius (1990), Turners Hill (1993), Bobinski (1995), Water Poet (1996), Kocab (2005), Last Train (2012), Sand Fox (2017)

Leading owner since 1980 (7 wins):
 Khalid Abdullah – Turners Hill (1993), Red Victory (1994), Kocab (2005), Zambezi Sun (2007), Last Train (2012), Teletext (2014), Bugle Major (2018)

Winners since 1980

 Tremel finished first in 1997, but he was relegated to second place following a stewards' inquiry.

 The 2017 race took place at Saint-Cloud while Longchamp was closed for redevelopment.

Earlier winners

 1894: Sesame
 1895: Chrome
 1896: Indus
 1897: Rouge Daim
 1898: Taillebourg
 1899: Sylphe
 1900: Ganymede
 1901: Pontife
 1902: Linaro
 1903: Theocles
 1904: Amiante
 1905: Phoenix
 1906: Fellah
 1907: Francois
 1908: Gigolo
 1909: Darwin
 1910: Cadet Roussel
 1911: Traversin
 1912: Ultimatum
 1913: El Tango
 1914: Mon Petiot
 1919: Cesaire
 1920: Calabar
 1921: Rambour
 1922: Keror
 1923: Anna Bolena
 1924: Vineuil
 1925: Myrio
 1926: Dark Japan
 1927: Mon Talisman
 1928: Ivanoe
 1929: Cheval de Troie
 1930: Fayoum
 1931: Valreas
 1932: Shred
 1933: Jumbo
 1934: Revendi
 1935: Furlico
 1936: Petit Jean
 1937: Chesham
 1938: Bois Roussel
 1939: Hunter's Moon
 1940: King of Trumps
 1941: Morosini
 1942: Erromango
 1943: Vatelys
 1944: Bucephale
 1946: Laurentis
 1947: Parisien
 1948: Goyaz
 1949: Highlander
 1950: Fast Fox
 1951: Stymphale
 1952: Magyar
 1953: Northern Light
 1954: Popof
 1955: Datour
 1956: Tanerko
 1957: Le Tricolore
 1958: Noelor
 1959: Vamour
 1960: Nymphellor
 1961: Match
 1962: Ray
 1963: Beau Persan
 1965: Sunday
 1966: Premier Violon
 1967: Misyaaf
 1968: Tapalque
 1969: Chimo
 1970: Kautokeino
 1971: Charonville
 1972: Mr Long
 1973: Palikare
 1975: Sanctum
 1976: Aberdeen Park
 1977: Vagaries
 1979: Simiso
</div>

See also
 List of French flat horse races
 Recurring sporting events established in 1894 – this race is included under its original title, Prix de la Reine Marguerite.

References

 France Galop / Racing Post:

 galopp-sieger.de – Prix Juigné.
 pedigreequery.com – Prix Juigné – Longchamp.

Flat horse races for three-year-olds
Longchamp Racecourse
Horse races in France